Josef Rösch (April 27, 1925 – January 17, 2016) was a researcher and pioneer in vascular and interventional radiology. Rösch was the first director of the Dotter Interventional Institute and served until 1995. He is credited with developing the TIPS procedure in 1969 and the incorporation of embolization into the treatment of gastrointestinal bleeding in 1971. Dr. Rösch's work in the field of interventional radiology spans half a century and has resulted in over 470 scientific papers, multiple book chapters and dozens of scientific exhibits.

Biography

Early life and training
Josef Rösch was born in Pilsen, Czechoslovakia, in 1925. He credits his mother for inspiring him to help others and become a physician. Rösch attended medical school at Charles University in Prague and graduated in 1950. Initially, Rösch aspired to be an internist but decided to pursue radiology after working on splenoportography. After publishing a book on splenoportography, Rösch become friends with Charles Dotter. They would meet in 1963 at the  Czechoslovak Radiologic Congress in Karlovy Vary, where Dotter gave his famous lecture on angiography, effectively creating the field of interventional radiology. Dotter recruited Rösch to do a one-year fellowship at Oregon Health and Science University. After the fellowship, Rösch spent two years at UCLA before returning to Oregon in 1970.

Interventional radiology career
While Josef Rösch helped advance many aspects of interventional radiology, his crowning achievements were the development of the TIPS procedure and the incorporation of embolization into the treatment of gastrointestinal hemorrhage. The invention of the TIPS procedure, which creates a shunt between the portal and systemic venous circulation, revolutionized the treatment for portal hypertension. Similarly, arterial embolization for gastrointestinal bleeds became a powerful tool for life-threatening hemorrhages. Other techniques Rösch worked on include super-selective catheterization, expandable stents, thrombolysis and visceral angiography.

Rösch would become the chief of vascular and interventional radiology at Oregon Health & Science University. During the late 1980s, his work helped found the Dotter Interventional Institute. Rösch retired from clinical practice in 1995 and has since served in a research faculty role at the Dotter Institute.

Awards 
Some of Rösch's notable awards include:

 SCVIR Gold Medal
 Japanese Society of Angiography and Interventional Radiology Gold Medal
 European Radiological Congress and Western Angiographic and Interventional Society Gold Medal
 The Interventional Radiology Lifetime Achievement Award from Cardiovascular Interventional Radiology Society of Europe
 600 Year Anniversary Medal of Charles University in Prague
 The AHA Scientific Council Distinguished Achievement and Distinguished Scientist Awards

References

Sources
Greene and Linton (2005). The History of Dotter Interventonal Institute: 15 Years of Education, Research, Patient Care 1990-2005. .

External links 
 Josef Rösch - Dotter Interventional Institute
 obit

American radiologists
1925 births
Physicians from Portland, Oregon
Czechoslovak emigrants to the United States
Scientists from Plzeň
2016 deaths
Oregon Health & Science University faculty
Physicians from Plzeň
Charles University alumni